This is a list of WPMF world champions, showing every male world champion certificated by the World Professional Muaythai Federation (WPMF). The WPMF, which is one of the major governing bodies in professional Muay Thai(Thai boxing), started certifying their own Muay Thai world champions in 17 different weight classes.

Super heavyweight

Heavyweight

Cruiserweight

Light heavyweight

Super middleweight

Middleweight

Super welterweight

Welterweight

Super lightweight

Lightweight

Super featherweight

Featherweight

Super Bantamweight

Bantamweight

Super flyweight

Flyweight

Light flyweight

Mini flyweight

See also
List of WPMF female world champions
List of WBC Muaythai world champions
List of IBF Muaythai world champions

References

Lists of Muay Thai champions
WPMF